The Moors murders were carried out by Ian Brady and Myra Hindley between July 1963 and October 1965, in and around Manchester, England. The victims were five children—Pauline Reade, John Kilbride, Keith Bennett, Lesley Ann Downey, and Edward Evans—aged between 10 and 17, at least four of whom were sexually assaulted. The bodies of two of the victims were discovered in 1965, in graves dug on Saddleworth Moor; a third grave was discovered there in 1987, more than twenty years after Brady and Hindley's trial. Bennett's body is also thought to be buried there, but despite repeated searches it remains undiscovered.

The pair were charged only for the murders of Kilbride, Downey and Evans, and received life sentences under a whole life tariff. The investigation was reopened in 1985 after Brady was reported as having confessed to the murders of Reade and Bennett. After confessing to these additional murders, Brady and Hindley were taken separately to Saddleworth Moor to assist in the search for the graves.

Characterised by the press as "the most evil woman in Britain", Hindley made several appeals against her life sentence, claiming she was a reformed woman and no longer a danger to society, but was never released. She died in 2002 in West Suffolk Hospital, aged 60, after serving 36 years in prison.

Brady was diagnosed as a psychopath in 1985 and confined in the high-security Ashworth Hospital. He made it clear that he never wished to be released and repeatedly asked to be allowed to die. He died in 2017, at Ashworth, aged 79.

The murders were the result of what Malcolm MacCulloch, professor of forensic psychiatry at Cardiff University, described as a "concatenation of circumstances". The trial judge, Justice Fenton Atkinson, described Brady and Hindley in his closing remarks as "two sadistic killers of the utmost depravity". Their crimes were the subject of extensive worldwide media coverage.

Background

Ian Brady
Ian Brady was born in the Gorbals area of Glasgow, Scotland, as Ian Duncan Stewart on 2 January 1938 to Margaret "Peggy" Stewart, an unmarried tea room waitress. The identity of Brady's father has never been reliably ascertained, although his mother said he was a reporter working for a Glasgow newspaper who died three months before Brady was born. Stewart had little support and after a few months was forced to give her son into the care of Mary and John Sloan, a local couple with four children of their own. Brady took their family name and became known as Ian Sloan. His mother continued to visit him throughout his childhood. Aged 9, he visited Loch Lomond with his family, where he reportedly discovered an affinity for the outdoors. A few months later the family moved to a new council house on an overspill estate at Pollok. Various authors have stated that he tortured animals, although Brady objected to such accusations. It was reported, for example, that Brady boasted of killing his first cat when he was aged just 10, and then went on to burn another cat alive, stone dogs and cut off rabbits' heads. Brady was accepted for Shawlands Academy, a school for above-average pupils.

Brady's behaviour worsened at Shawlands; as a teenager he twice appeared before a juvenile court for housebreaking. He left the academy aged 15 and took a job as a tea boy at a Harland and Wolff shipyard in Govan. Nine months later, he began working as a butcher's messenger boy. Brady had a girlfriend, Evelyn Grant, but their relationship ended when he threatened her with a flick knife after she visited a dance with another boy. He again appeared before the court, this time with nine charges against him, and shortly before his 17th birthday he was placed on probation on condition that he live with his mother. By then, Brady's mother had moved to Manchester and married an Irish fruit merchant named Patrick Brady; Patrick got Ian a job as a fruit porter at Smithfield Market, and Ian took Patrick's surname.

Within a year of moving to Manchester, Brady was caught with a sack full of lead seals he had stolen and was trying to smuggle out of the market. He was sent to Strangeways for three months. As he was still under 18, Brady was sentenced to two years in a borstal for "training". He was sent to Latchmere House in London, and then Hatfield borstal in the West Riding of Yorkshire. After being discovered drunk on alcohol he had brewed, he was moved to the much tougher unit in Hull. Released on 14 November 1957, Brady returned to Manchester, where he took a labouring job which he hated, and was dismissed from another job in a brewery. Deciding to "better himself", he obtained a set of instruction manuals on book-keeping from a local public library, with which he "astonished" his parents by studying alone in his room for hours.

In January 1959, Brady applied for, and was offered, a clerical job at Millwards, a wholesale chemical distribution company based in Gorton. He was regarded by his colleagues as a quiet, punctual, but short-tempered young man. Brady read books, including Teach Yourself German and Mein Kampf, as well as works on Nazi atrocities. He rode a Tiger Cub motorcycle, which he used to visit the Pennines.

Myra Hindley
Myra Hindley was born in Crumpsall on 23 July 1942 to parents Nellie and Bob Hindley and raised in Gorton, then a working-class area of Manchester dominated by Victorian slum housing. Her father was an alcoholic who was frequently violent towards his wife and children. The family home was in poor condition and Hindley was forced to sleep in a single bed next to her parents' double bed. Their living situation deteriorated further when Hindley's sister, Maureen, was born in August 1946, and the following year five-year-old Myra was sent to live nearby with her grandmother.

Hindley's father had served with the Parachute Regiment and was stationed in North Africa, Cyprus and Italy during the Second World War. He had been known as a hard man while in the army and he expected his daughter to be equally tough; he taught her to fight and insisted that she stick up for herself. When Hindley was aged about eight, a local boy scratched her cheeks, drawing blood. She burst into tears and ran to her father, who threatened to "leather" her if she did not retaliate; Hindley found the boy and knocked him down with a series of punches. As she wrote later, "At eight years old I'd scored my first victory". Malcolm MacCulloch, professor of forensic psychiatry at Cardiff University, has written that Hindley's "relationship with her father brutalised her ... She was not only used to violence in the home but rewarded for it outside. When this happens at a young age, it can distort a person's reaction to such situations for life."

In June 1957, one of Hindley's closest friends, 13-year-old Michael Higgins, invited Hindley to go swimming with friends at a local disused reservoir, but she instead went out elsewhere with another friend. Higgins drowned in the reservoir, and Hindleya good swimmerwas deeply upset and blamed herself. She took up a collection for a wreath; his funeral was held at St Francis's Monastery in Gorton Lane.

The monastery where, as an infant in 1942, Hindley had been baptised a Catholic, had a lasting effect on her. Hindley's father had insisted she have a Catholic baptism, and her mother agreed, on the condition that she not be sent to a Catholic school; Nellie Hindley believed that "all the monks taught was the catechism". Hindley was increasingly drawn to the Roman Catholic Church after she started at Ryder Brow Secondary Modern, and began taking instruction for formal reception into the Church soon after Higgins's funeral. She took the confirmation name of Veronica and received her First Communion in November 1958.

Hindley's first job was as a junior clerk at a local electrical engineering firm. She ran errands, typed, made tea, and was well liked enough that when she lost her first week's wage packet, the other girls took up a collection to replace it. At 17, she became engaged after a short courtship, but called it off several months later after deciding the young man was immature and unable to provide her with the life she wanted. Hindley took weekly judo lessons at a local school, but found partners reluctant to train with her, as she was often slow to release her grip. She took a job at Bratby and Hinchliffe, an engineering company in Gorton, but was dismissed for absenteeism after six months.

As a couple
In January 1961, the 18-year-old Hindley joined Millwards as a typist. She soon became infatuated with Brady, despite learning that he had a criminal record. Hindley began a diary and, although she had dates with other men, some of the entries detail her fascination with Brady, to whom she eventually spoke for the first time on 27 July. Over the next few months she continued to make entries, but grew increasingly disillusioned with him, until 22 December when Brady asked her on a date to the cinema. (Many sources state that the film was Judgment at Nuremberg, but Hindley recalled it as King of Kings.) Their dates followed a regular pattern: a trip to the cinema, usually to watch an X-rated film, then back to Hindley's house to drink German wine. Brady then gave her reading material and the pair spent their work lunch breaks reading aloud to one another from accounts of Nazi atrocities. Hindley began to emulate an ideal of Aryan perfection, bleaching her hair blonde and applying thick crimson lipstick. She expressed concern at some aspects of Brady's character; in a letter to a childhood friend, she mentioned an incident where she had been drugged by Brady, but also wrote of her obsession with him. A few months later, she asked her friend to destroy the letter. In her 30,000-word plea for parole, written in 1978 and 1979 and submitted to Home Secretary Merlyn Rees, Hindley said:

Hindley began to change her appearance further, wearing clothing considered risqué such as high boots, short skirts and leather jackets, and the two became less sociable to their colleagues. The couple were regulars at the library, borrowing books on philosophy, as well as crime and torture. They also read works by the Marquis de Sade, Friedrich Nietzsche and Fyodor Dostoevsky's Crime and Punishment. Although Hindley was not a qualified driver (she passed her test on 7 November 1963 after failing three times), she often hired a van, in which the couple planned bank robberies. Hindley befriended George Clitheroe, the President of the Cheadle Rifle Club, and on several occasions visited two local shooting ranges. Clitheroe, although puzzled by her interest, arranged for her to buy a .22 rifle from a gun merchant in Manchester. She also asked to join a pistol club, but she was a poor shot and allegedly often bad-tempered, so Clitheroe told her that she was unsuitable. She did, however, manage to purchase a Webley .45 and a Smith & Wesson .38 from other members of the club. Brady and Hindley's plans for robbery came to nothing, but they became interested in photography. Brady already owned a Box Brownie, which he used to take photographs of Hindley and her dog, Puppet, but he upgraded to a more sophisticated model, and also purchased lights and darkroom equipment. The pair took photographs of each other that, for the time, would have been considered explicit. For Hindley, this demonstrated a marked change from her earlier, more shy and prudish nature.

As murderers

Hindley claimed that Brady began to talk about "committing the perfect murder" in July 1963, and often spoke to her about Meyer Levin's Compulsion, published as a novel in 1956 and adapted for the cinema in 1959. The story tells a fictionalised account of the Leopold and Loeb case, two young men from well-to-do families who attempt to commit the perfect murder of a 12-year-old boy, and who escape the death penalty because of their age.

By June 1963, Brady had moved in with Hindley at her grandmother's house in Bannock Street, and on 12 July, the two murdered their first victim, Pauline Reade. Reade had attended school with Hindley's younger sister Maureen, and had also been in a short relationship with David Smith, a local boy with three criminal convictions for minor crimes. Police found no one who had seen Reade before her disappearance, and although the 15-year-old Smith was questioned by police, he was cleared of any involvement in her death.

Their next victim, John Kilbride, was killed on 23 November. A huge search was undertaken, with over 700 statements taken, and 500 "missing" posters printed. Eight days after he failed to return home, 2,000 volunteers scoured waste ground and derelict buildings. Hindley hired a vehicle a week after Kilbride went missing, and again on 21 December, apparently to make sure the burial sites at Saddleworth Moor had not been disturbed. In February 1964, she bought a second-hand Austin Traveller, but soon after traded it for a Mini van.

Keith Bennett disappeared on 16 June 1964. His stepfather, Jimmy Johnson, became a suspect; in the two years following Bennett's disappearance, Johnson was taken for questioning on four occasions. Detectives searched under the floorboards of the Johnsons' house, and on discovering that the houses in the row were connected, extended the search to the entire street.

Hindley's sister, Maureen, married David Smith on 15 August 1964. The marriage was hastily arranged and performed at a register office. None of Maureen's relatives attended. Hindley did not approve of the marriage, and her mother was embarrassed, as Maureen was then seven months pregnant. The newlyweds moved into Smith's father's house. The next day, Brady suggested that the four take a day-trip to Windermere. This was the first time Brady and Smith had met properly, and Brady was apparently impressed by Smith's demeanour. The two talked about society, the distribution of wealth, and the possibility of robbing a bank. The young Smith was similarly impressed by Brady, who throughout the day had paid for his food and wine. The trip to the Lake District was the first of many outings. Hindley was apparently jealous of their friendship, but became closer to her sister.

In 1964, Hindley, her grandmother, and Brady were rehoused as part of the post-war slum clearances in Manchester, to 16 Wardle Brook Avenue in the new overspill estate of Hattersley, Cheshire. Brady and Hindley became friendly with Patricia Hodges, an 11-year-old girl who lived at 12 Wardle Brook Avenue. Hodges accompanied the two on their trips to Saddleworth Moor to collect peat, something that many householders on the new estate did to improve the soil in their gardens, which were full of clay and builder's rubble. The couple never harmed Hodges, since she lived only a few doors away, which would have made it easy for police to solve any disappearance.

Early on Boxing Day 1964, Hindley left her grandmother at a relative's house and refused to allow her back to Wardle Brook Avenue that night. On the same day, Lesley Ann Downey disappeared from a funfair in Ancoats. Despite a huge search, she was not found. The following day, Hindley brought her grandmother back home. By February 1965, Hodges had stopped visiting Wardle Brook Avenue, but Smith was still a regular visitor. Brady gave Smith books to read, and the two discussed robbery and murder. On Hindley's 23rd birthday, her sister and brother-in-law, who had until then been living with relatives, were rehoused in Underwood Court, a block of flats not far from Wardle Brook Avenue. The two couples began to see each other more regularly, but usually only on Brady's terms.

During the 1990s, Hindley claimed that she took part in the killings only because Brady had drugged her, was blackmailing her with pornographic pictures he had taken of her, and had threatened to kill Maureen. In 2008 Hindley's solicitor, Andrew McCooey, reported that she told him:

Murders

Pauline Reade
On 12 July 1963, Brady told Hindley that he wanted to commit the "perfect murder". After work he instructed her to drive a borrowed van around while he followed on his motorcycle; when he spotted a likely victim he would flash his headlight. Driving down Gorton Lane, Brady saw a young girl and signalled Hindley, who did not stop because she recognised the girl as an 8-year-old neighbour of her mother. Sometime after 7:30 pm, on Froxmer Street, Brady signalled Hindley to stop for 16-year-old Pauline Reade, a schoolmate of Hindley's sister Maureen on her way to a dance; Hindley offered Reade a lift. At various times Hindley gave conflicting statements about the extent to which she, versus Brady, was responsible for Reade being selected as their first victim, but said she felt that there would be less attention given to the disappearance of a teenager than of an 8-year-old.

Once Reade was in the van, Hindley asked her to help in searching Saddleworth Moor for an expensive lost glove; Reade agreed and they drove there. When Brady arrived on his motorcycle, Hindley told Reade he would be helping in the search. Hindley later claimed that she waited in the van while Brady took Reade onto the moor. Brady returned alone after about thirty minutes, and took Hindley to the spot where Reade lay dying; Reade's clothes were in disarray and she had been nearly decapitated by two cuts to the throat, including a four-inch incision across her voice box "inflicted with considerable force" and into which the collar of her coat and a throat chain had been pushed. When Hindley asked Brady whether he had raped Reade, Brady replied, "Of course I did." Hindley stayed with Reade while Brady retrieved a spade he had hidden nearby on a previous visit, then returned to the van while Brady buried Reade. In Brady's account, Hindley was not only present for the attack, but participated in the sexual assault.

John Kilbride
In the early evening of 23 November 1963, at a market in Ashton-under-Lyne, Brady and Hindley offered 12-year-old John Kilbride a lift home, saying his parents might worry that he was out so late; they also promised him a bottle of sherry. Once Kilbride was inside Hindley's hired Ford Anglia car, Brady said they would have to make a detour to their home for the sherry. En route he suggested another detour, this time to search for a glove Hindley had lost on the moor. When they reached the moor Brady took Kilbride with him while Hindley waited in the car; Brady sexually assaulted Kilbride and tried to slit his throat with a six-inch serrated blade before strangling him with a shoelace or string.

Keith Bennett

Early in the evening of 16 June 1964, Hindley asked twelve-year-old Keith Bennett, who was on his way to his grandmother's house in Longsight, for help in loading some boxes into her Mini Pick-up, after which she said she would drive him home. Brady was in the back of the van. Hindley drove to a lay-by on Saddleworth Moor and Brady went off with Bennett, supposedly looking for a lost glove. After about thirty minutes Brady returned alone, carrying a spade that he had hidden there earlier, and, in response to Hindley's questions, said that he had sexually assaulted Bennett and strangled him with a piece of string.

Lesley Ann Downey

Brady and Hindley visited a funfair in Ancoats on 26 December 1964 and noticed that 10-year-old Lesley Ann Downey was apparently alone. They approached her and deliberately dropped some shopping they were carrying, then asked her for help in taking the packages to their car, and then to Wardle Brook Avenue. At the house Downey was undressed, gagged, and forcibly posed for photographs before being raped and killed, perhaps strangled with a piece of string. Hindley later maintained that she went to fill a bath for Downey and found her dead when she returned; Brady claimed that Hindley killed Downey. The following morning Brady and Hindley drove Downey's body to Saddleworth Moor, and buried hernaked with her clothes at her feetin a shallow grave.

Edward Evans
On the evening of 6 October 1965, Hindley drove Brady to Manchester Central railway station, where she waited outside in the car whilst he selected a victim. After a few minutes Brady reappeared in the company of 17-year-old Edward Evans, an apprentice engineer who lived in Ardwick, to whom he introduced Hindley as his sister. Brady later claimed that he had picked up Evans for a sexual encounter. They drove to Brady and Hindley's home at Wardle Brook Avenue, where they relaxed over a bottle of wine.

At some point Brady sent Hindley to fetch Smith, her brother-in-law. Hindley's family had not approved of Maureen's marriage to Smith, who had several criminal convictions, including actual bodily harm and housebreaking, the first of which, wounding with intent, occurred when he was 11. Throughout the previous year Brady had been cultivating a friendship with Smith, who had become "in awe" of Brady, something that increasingly worried Hindley as she felt it compromised their safety.

Hindley returned with Smith and told him to wait outside for her signal, a flashing light. When the signal came, Smith knocked on the door and was met by Brady, who asked if he had come for "the miniature wine bottles", and left him in the kitchen saying that he was going to collect the wine. Smith later told the police:

Smith then watched Brady throttle Evans with a length of electrical cord. Brady sprained his ankle in the struggle, and Evans's body was too heavy for Smith to carry to the car on his own, so they wrapped it in plastic sheeting and put it in the spare bedroom.

Investigation

Arrest 
After the murder of Evans, Smith agreed to return the following morning with his baby's pram, to transport the body to the car, before disposing of it on the moor. He arrived home around 3:00a.m. and asked his wife to make a cup of tea, which he drank before vomiting and telling her what he had witnessed. At 6:10a.m., having waited for daylight and armed himself with a screwdriver and bread knifein case Brady was planning to intercept himSmith called police from a phone box on the estate. He was picked up by a police car from the phone box and taken to Hyde police station, where he told officers what he had witnessed in the night.

Superintendent Bob Talbot of the Stalybridge police division went to Wardle Brook Avenue, accompanied by a detective sergeant. Wearing a bread deliveryman's overall on top of his uniform, he asked Hindley at the back door if her husband was home. When she denied that she had a husband or that a man was in the house, Talbot identified himself. Hindley led him into the living room, where Brady was lying on a divan, writing to his employer about his ankle injury. Talbot explained that he was investigating "an act of violence involving guns" that was reported to have taken place the previous evening. Hindley denied there had been any violence, and allowed police to look around the house. When police asked for the key to the locked spare bedroom, she said it was at her workplace; but after police offered to take her to retrieve it, Brady told her to hand it over. When police returned to the living room they arrested Brady on suspicion of murder. As Brady was getting dressed, he said, "Eddie and I had a row and the situation got out of hand."

Initial analysis 
Though Hindley was not initially arrested, she demanded to go with Brady to the police station, taking her dog. She refused to make any statement about Evans's death beyond claiming it had been an accident, and was allowed to go home on the condition that she return the next day. Over the next four days Hindley visited her employer and asked to be dismissed so that she would be eligible for unemployment benefits. On one of these occasions, she found an envelope belonging to Brady which she burned in an ashtray; she claimed she did not open it but believed it contained plans for bank robberies. On 11 October, she too was arrested and taken into custody. She was charged as an accessory to the murder of Evans and remanded at HM Prison Risley.

Police searching the house at Wardle Brook Avenue found an old exercise book with the name "John Kilbride", which made them suspect that Brady and Hindley had been involved in the disappearances of other young people. Brady told police that he and Evans had fought, but insisted that he and Smith had murdered Evans and that Hindley had "only done what she had been told". Smith said that Brady had asked him to return anything incriminating, such as "dodgy books", which Brady then packed into suitcases; he had no idea what else the suitcases contained or where they might be, though he mentioned that Brady "had a thing about railway stations". A search of left-luggage offices turned up the suitcases at Manchester Central railway station on 15 October; the claim ticket was later found in Hindley's prayer book. Inside one of the cases were—among an assortment of costumes, notes, photographs and negatives—nine pornographic photographs taken of Downey, naked and with a scarf tied across her mouth, and a sixteen-minute audiotape recording of a girl identifying herself as "Lesley Ann Weston" screaming, crying, and pleading to be allowed to return home to her mother. Downey's mother later confirmed that the recording, too, was of her daughter.

Officers making inquiries at neighbouring houses spoke to 12-year-old Patricia Hodges, who had on several occasions been taken to Saddleworth Moor by Brady and Hindley, and was able to point out their favourite sites along the A635 road. Police immediately began to search the area, and on 16 October found an arm bone protruding from the peat, which was presumed at first to be Kilbride's, but which the next day was identified as that of Downey, whose body was still visually identifiable; her mother was able to identify the clothing which had also been buried in the grave.

Also among the photographs in the suitcase were a number of scenes of the Moors. Smith had told police that Brady had boasted of "photographic proof" of multiple murders, and officers, struck by Brady's decision to remove the apparently innocent landscapes from the house, appealed to locals for assistance finding locations to match the photographs. On 21 October they found the "badly decomposed" body of Kilbride, which had to be identified by clothing. That same day, already being held for the murder of Evans, Brady and Hindley appeared at Hyde Magistrates' Court charged with Downey's murder. Each was brought before the court separately and remanded into custody for a week. They made a two-minute appearance on 28 October, and were again remanded into custody.

The investigating officers suspected Brady and Hindley of murdering other missing children and teenagers who had disappeared from areas in and around Manchester over the previous few years, and the search for bodies continued after the discovery of Kilbride's body, but with winter setting in it was called off in November.

Presented with the evidence of the tape recording, Brady admitted to taking the photographs of Downey, but insisted that she had been brought to Wardle Brook Avenue by two men who had subsequently taken her away again, alive. By 2 December, Brady had been charged with the murders of Kilbride, Downey and Evans. Hindley had been charged with the murders of Downey and Evans, and being an accessory to the murder of Kilbride. At the committal hearing on 6 December, Brady was charged with the murders of Evans, Kilbride, and Downey, and Hindley with the murders of Evans and Downey, as well as with harbouring Brady in the knowledge that he had killed Kilbride. The prosecution's opening statement was held in camera rather than in open court, and the defence asked for a similar stipulation but was refused. The proceedings continued before three magistrates in Hyde over an eleven-day period during December, at the end of which the pair were committed for trial at Chester Assizes.

Many of the photographs taken by Brady and Hindley on the moor featured Hindley's dog Puppet, sometimes as a puppy. To help date the photos, detectives had a veterinary surgeon examine the dog to determine his age; the examination required a general anaesthetic from which Puppet did not recover. Hindley was furious, and accused the police of murdering the dog – one of the few occasions detectives witnessed any emotional response from her. Hindley wrote to her mother:

Trial 
The 14-day trial began in a specially-prepared court room at Chester Assizes before Justice Fenton Atkinson, on 19 April 1966. The dock was fitted with bullet proof glass to protect Brady and Hindley because it was feared that someone might try and kill them. Other elaborate security precautions included a public address system costing £2,500 and £500 worth of telephone equipment. National and international journalists covering the trial booked up most of the city's hotel rooms. Onlookers – some travelling for hours – would stand outside Chester Assizes every day during the trial.

Brady and Hindley were charged with murdering Evans, Downey and Kilbride. The Attorney General, Sir Elwyn Jones, led the prosecution, assisted by William Mars-Jones. Brady was defended by Emlyn Hooson QC, the Liberal Member of Parliament (MP), and Hindley was defended by Godfrey Heilpern QC, recorder of Salford from 1964; both were experienced Queen's Counsel. 

Smith was the chief prosecution witness. Before the trial, the News of the World newspaper offered £1,000 to Smith for the rights to his story; the American People magazine made a competing offer of £6,000 (equivalent to about £ and £ respectively in ). When Smith accepted the News of the World offer—its editors had promised additional future payments for syndication and serialisation—he agreed to be paid £15 weekly until the trial, and £1,000 in a lump sum if Brady and Hindley were convicted. During the trial, the judge and defence barristers repeatedly questioned Smith and his wife about the nature of the arrangement. At first, Smith refused to name the newspaper, risking contempt of court; when he eventually identified the News of the World, Jones, as Attorney General, immediately promised an investigation. Comparing Smith's testimony with his initial statements to police, Atkinson—though describing the paper's actions as "gross interference with the course of justice"—concluded it was not "substantially affected" by the financial incentive. Jones decided not to charge the News of the World on similar grounds.

Both Brady and Hindley entered pleas of not guilty; Brady testified for over eight hours, Hindley for six. Brady admitted to striking Evans with the axe, but claimed that someone else had killed Evans, pointing to the pathologist's statement that his death had been "accelerated by strangulation"; Brady's "calm, undisguised arrogance did not endear him to the jury [and] neither did his pedantry", wrote Duncan Staff. Hindley denied any knowledge that the photographs of Saddleworth Moor found by police had been taken near the graves of their victims.

The sixteen-minute tape recording of Downey, on which the voices of Brady and Hindley were audible, was played in open court. Hindley admitted that her attitude towards Downey was "brusque and cruel", but claimed that was only because she was afraid that someone might hear Downey screaming. Hindley claimed that when Downey was being undressed she herself was "downstairs"; when the pornographic photographs were taken she was "looking out the window"; and that when Downey was being strangled she "was running a bath".

On 6 May, after having deliberated for a little over two hours, the jury found Brady guilty of all three murders, and Hindley guilty of the murders of Downey and Evans. As the death penalty for murder had been abolished while Brady and Hindley were held on remand, the judge passed the only sentence that the law allowed: life imprisonment. Brady was sentenced to three concurrent life sentences and Hindley was given two, plus a concurrent seven-year term for harbouring Brady in the knowledge that he had murdered Kilbride. Brady was taken to HM Prison Durham and Hindley was sent to HM Prison Holloway.

In his closing remarks, Atkinson described the murders as "truly horrible" and the accused as "two sadistic killers of the utmost depravity"; he recommended they spend "a very long time" in prison before being considered for parole, but did not stipulate a tariff. He called Brady "wicked beyond belief" and said he saw no reasonable possibility of reform for him, though he did not think the same necessarily true of Hindley once "removed from [Brady's] influence". Throughout the trial Brady and Hindley "stuck rigidly to their strategy of lying", and Hindley was later described as "a quiet, controlled, impassive witness who lied remorselessly".

Later investigation 
Since Brady and Hindley's arrests, newspapers had been keen to connect them to other missing children and teenagers from the area. One such victim was Stephen Jennings, a three-year-old West Yorkshire boy who was last seen alive in December 1962; his body was found buried in a field in 1988, but the following year his father, William Jennings, was found guilty of his murder. Jennifer Tighe, a 14-year-old girl who disappeared from an Oldham children's home in December 1964, was mentioned in the press some forty years later but was confirmed by police to be alive. This followed claims in 2004 that Hindley had told another inmate that she and Brady had murdered a sixth victim, a teenage girl.

In 1985, Brady allegedly told Fred Harrison, a journalist working for The Sunday People, that he had killed Reade and Bennett, something the police already suspected as both lived near Brady and Hindley and had disappeared at about the same time as Kilbride and Downey. Greater Manchester Police (GMP) reopened the investigation, now to be headed by Detective Chief Superintendent Peter Topping, head of GMP's Criminal Investigation Department (CID).

On 3 July 1985, DCS Topping visited Brady, then being held at HM Prison Gartree in Leicestershire, but found him "scornful of any suggestion that he had confessed to more murders". Police nevertheless decided to resume their search of Saddleworth Moor, once more using the photographs taken by Brady and Hindley to help them identify possible burial sites. In November 1986, Bennett's mother wrote to Hindley begging to know what had happened to her son, a letter that Hindley seemed to be "genuinely moved" by. It ended: "I am a simple woman, I work in the kitchens of Christie's Hospital. It has taken me five weeks labour to write this letter because it is so important to me that it is understood by you for what it is, a plea for help. Please, Miss Hindley, help me."

Police visited Hindley – then being held in HM Prison Cookham Wood in Kent – a few days after she received the letter, and although she refused to admit any involvement in the killings, she agreed to help by looking at photographs and maps to try to identify spots she had visited with Brady. She showed particular interest in photos of the area around Hollin Brown Knoll and Shiny Brook, but said that it was impossible to be sure of the locations without visiting the moor. Home Secretary Douglas Hurd agreed with DCS Topping that a visit would be worth risking despite security problems presented by threats against Hindley. Writing in 1989, Topping said that he felt "quite cynical" about Hindley's motivation in helping the police. Although Winnie Johnson's letter may have played a part, he believed that Hindley, knowing of Brady's "precarious" mental state, was concerned he might co-operate with the police and reap any available public-approval benefit.

On 16 December 1986, Hindley made the first of two visits to assist the police search of the moor. Police closed all roads onto the moor, which was patrolled by 200 officers, some armed. Hindley and her solicitor left Cookham Wood at 4:30 am, flew to the moor by helicopter from an airfield near Maidstone, and then were driven, and walked, around the area until 3:00 pm. Hindley had difficulty connecting what she saw to her memories, and was apparently nervous of the helicopters flying overhead. The press described the visit as a "fiasco", a "publicity stunt", and a "mindless waste of money", but DCS Topping defended it, saying "we needed a thorough systematic search of the moor ... It would never have been possible to carry out such a search in private."

On 19 December, David Smith, then 38, spent about four hours on the moor helping police identify additional areas to be searched. DCS Topping continued to visit Hindley in prison, along with her solicitor Michael Fisher and her spiritual counsellor, Peter Timms, who had been a prison governor before becoming a Methodist minister. On 10 February 1987 Hindley formally confessed to involvement in all five murders, but this was not made public for more than a month. The tape recording of her statement was over seventeen hours long; Topping described it as a "very well worked out performance in which, I believe, she told me just as much as she wanted me to know, and no more". He added that he "was struck by the fact that [in Hindley's telling] she was never there when the killings took place. She was in the car, over the brow of the hill, in the bathroom and even, in the case of the Evans murder, in the kitchen"; he felt he "had witnessed a great performance rather than a genuine confession".

Police visited Brady in prison again and told him of Hindley's confession, which at first he refused to believe. Once presented with some of the details that Hindley had provided of Reade's abduction, Brady decided that he too was prepared to confess, but on one condition: that immediately afterwards he be given the means to commit suicide, a request with which it was impossible for the authorities to comply.

At about the same time, Johnson sent Hindley another letter, again pleading with her to assist the police in finding the body of her son Keith. In the letter, Johnson was sympathetic to Hindley over the criticism surrounding her first visit. Hindley, who had not replied to the first letter, responded by thanking Johnson for both letters, explaining that her decision not to reply to the first resulted from the negative publicity that surrounded it. She claimed that, had Johnson written to her fourteen years earlier, she would have confessed and helped the police. She also paid tribute to DCS Topping, and thanked Johnson for her sincerity. Hindley made her second visit to the moor in March 1987. This time, the level of security surrounding her visit was considerably higher. She stayed overnight in Manchester, at the flat of the police chief in charge of GMP training at Sedgley Park, Prestwich, and visited the moor twice. Hindley confirmed to police that the two areas in which they were concentrating their search—Hollin Brown Knoll and Hoe Grain—were correct, although she was unable to locate either of the graves. She did, though, later remember that as Reade was being buried she had been sitting next to her on a patch of grass and could see the rocks of Hollin Brown Knoll silhouetted against the night sky.

In April 1987, news of Hindley's confession became public. Amidst strong media interest Lord Longford pleaded for her release, writing that continuing her detention to satisfy "mob emotion" was not right. Fisher persuaded Hindley to release a public statement, which touched on her reasons for denying her guilt previously, her religious experiences in prison, and the letter from Johnson. She said that she saw no possibility of release, and also exonerated Smith from any part in the murders other than that of Evans.

Over the next few months interest in the search waned, but Hindley's clue had focused efforts on a specific area. Brady had been co-operating with the police for some time, and when this news reached him he made a formal confession to DCS Topping, and in a statement to the press said that he too would help police in their search. He was taken to the moor on 3 July but seemed to lose his bearings, blaming changes in the intervening years; the search was called off at 3:00 pm, by which time a large crowd of press and television reporters had gathered on the moor.

DCS Topping refused to allow Brady a second visit to the moor before police called off their search on 24 August. Brady was taken to the moor a second time on 8 December, and claimed to have located Bennett's burial site, but the body was never found.

Soon after his first visit to the moor, Brady wrote a letter to a BBC reporter, giving some sketchy details of five additional deaths that he claimed to have been involved in: a man in the Piccadilly area of Manchester, another victim on Saddleworth Moor, two more in Scotland, and a woman whose body was allegedly dumped in a canal. Police, failing to discover any unsolved crimes matching the details that he supplied, decided that there was insufficient evidence to launch an official investigation. Hindley told Topping that she knew nothing of these killings.

Although Brady and Hindley had confessed to the murders of Reade and Bennett, the Director of Public Prosecutions (DPP) decided that nothing would be gained by a further trial; as both were already serving life sentences no further punishment could be inflicted.

In 2003, the police launched Operation Maida, and again searched the moor for Bennett's body, this time using sophisticated resources such as a US reconnaissance satellite which could detect soil disturbances. In mid-2009, the GMP said they had exhausted all avenues in the search for Bennett, that "only a major scientific breakthrough or fresh evidence would see the hunt for his body restart". It was stated that any further participation by Brady would be via a "walk through the moors virtually" using 3D modelling, rather than a visit by him to the moor. Donations from the public funded a search by volunteers from a Welsh search and rescue team in 2010. In 2012, it was claimed that Brady may have given details of the location of Bennett's body to a visitor; a woman was subsequently arrested on suspicion of preventing the burial of a body without lawful excuse, but a few months later the Crown Prosecution Service announced that there was insufficient evidence to press charges. In 2017, the police asked a court to order that two locked briefcases owned by Brady be opened, arguing that they might contain clues to the location of Bennett's body; the application was declined on the grounds that no prosecution was likely to result.

On 30 September 2022, Greater Manchester Police began a search for human remains on the moor after receiving information from amateur investigator and author Russell Edwards, who had reportedly found a skull. After seeing a photograph of a jaw bone, a spokesperson for the police said, of the identity of the remains, that it was "far too early to be certain". On 1 October the police reported that no further remains had been found. On 7 October the police announced they had ended their search without finding any sign of human remains.

Incarceration

Brady

Following his conviction Brady was moved to HM Prison Durham, where he asked to live in solitary confinement. He spent nineteen years in mainstream prisons before being diagnosed as a psychopath in November 1985 and sent to the high-security Park Lane Hospital, now Ashworth Hospital, in Maghull, Merseyside; he made it clear that he never wanted to be released.

The trial judge recommended that Brady's life sentence should mean life, and successive Home Secretaries agreed with that decision. In 1982, the Lord Chief Justice Lord Lane said of Brady: "this is the case if ever there is to be one when a man should stay in prison till he dies". The November 2007 death of John Straffen, who had spent 55 years in prison for murdering three children, meant that Brady became the longest-serving prisoner in England and Wales.

Although Brady refused to work with Ashworth's psychiatrists, he occasionally corresponded with people outside the hospitalsubject to prison authorities' censorship including Lord Longford, writer Colin Wilson, and various journalists. In one letter, written in 2005, Brady claimed that the murders were "merely an existential exercise of just over a year, which was concluded in December 1964". By then, he claimed, he and Hindley had turned their attention to armed robbery, for which they had begun to prepare by acquiring guns and vehicles.

During several years of interactions with forensic psychologist Chris Cowley, including face-to-face meetings, Brady told him of an "aesthetic fascination [he had] with guns", despite his never having used one to kill. He complained bitterly about conditions at Ashworth, which he hated. In 1999, his right wrist was broken in what he claimed was an "hour-long, unprovoked attack" by staff. Brady subsequently went on hunger strike, but while English law allows patients to refuse treatment, those being treated for mental disorders under the Mental Health Act 1983 have no such right if the treatment is for their mental disorder. He was therefore force-fed and transferred to another hospital for tests after he fell ill. Brady recovered and in March 2000 asked for a judicial review of the legality of the decision to force-feed him, but was refused permission.

In 2001, Brady wrote The Gates of Janus, which was published by the US underground publisher Feral House. The book, Brady's analysis of serial murder and specific serial killers, sparked outrage when announced in the UK. In the book, Brady recounted his friendship in prison with the "teacup poisoner" Graham Young, who shared Brady's admiration for Nazi Germany.

According to Cowley, Brady regretted Hindley's imprisonment and the consequences of their actions, but not necessarily the crimes themselves. He saw no point in making any kind of public apology; instead, he "expresse[d] remorse through actions". Twenty years of transcribing classical texts into braille came to an end when the authorities confiscated Brady's translation machine, for fear it might be used as a weapon. He once offered to donate one of his kidneys to "someone, anyone who needed one", but was blocked from doing so. According to Wilson, "it was because these attempts to express remorse were thrown back at him that he began to contemplate suicide". In 2006 officials intercepted 50 paracetamol pills hidden inside a hollowed-out crime novel sent to Brady by a female friend.

The mother of the remaining undiscovered victim, Keith Bennett, received a letter from Brady at the end of 2005 in which, she said, he claimed that he could take police to within  of her son's body but the authorities would not allow it. He did not refer directly to Bennett by name and did not claim he could take investigators directly to the grave, but spoke of the "clarity" of his recollections.

In 2012, Brady applied to be returned to prison, reiterating his desire to starve himself to death. At a mental health tribunal in June the following year, he claimed that he suffered not from paranoid schizophrenia, as his doctors at Ashworth maintained, but a personality disorder. Brady's application was rejected and the judge stated that he "continues to suffer from a mental disorder which is of a nature and degree which makes it appropriate for him to continue to receive medical treatment".

After receiving end-of-life care, Brady died of restrictive pulmonary disease at Ashworth Hospital on 15 May 2017; the inquest found that he died of natural causes and that his hunger strike had not been a contributory factor. Brady had refused food and fluids for more than forty-eight hours on various occasions, causing him to be fitted with a nasogastric tube, although his inquest noted that his body mass index was not a cause for concern. He was cremated without a ceremony, and his ashes disposed of at sea during the night.

Hindley
Hindley lodged an unsuccessful appeal against her conviction immediately after the trial. She corresponded with Brady by letter until 1971, when she ended their relationship. The two remained in sporadic contact for several months, but Hindley had fallen in love with one of her prison warders, Patricia Cairns. A former assistant governor claimed that such relationships were not unusual in Holloway at that time, as "many of the officers were gay, and involved in relationships either with one another or with inmates". Hindley successfully petitioned to have her status as a Category A prisoner changed to Category B, which enabled Governor Dorothy Wing to take her on a walk round Hampstead Heath, part of her unofficial policy of reintroducing her charges to the outside world when she felt they were ready. The excursion caused a furore in the national press and earned Wing an official rebuke from the then-Home Secretary Robert Carr. With help from Cairns, and the outside contacts of another prisoner, Maxine Croft, Hindley planned a prison escape, but it was thwarted when impressions of the prison keys were intercepted by an off-duty policeman. Cairns was sentenced to six years in jail for her part in the plot.

Hindley was told that she should spend twenty-five years in prison before being considered for parole. The Lord Chief Justice agreed with that recommendation in 1982, but in January 1985 Home Secretary Leon Brittan increased her tariff to thirty years. By that time Hindley claimed to be a reformed Catholic. Downey's mother was at the centre of a campaign to ensure that Hindley was never released from prison, and until her death in February 1999, she regularly gave television and newspaper interviews whenever Hindley's release was rumoured. In February 1985, Prime Minister Margaret Thatcher told Brittan that his proposed minimum sentences of thirty years for Hindley and forty years for Brady were too short, saying, "I do not think that either of these prisoners should ever be released from custody. Their crime was the most hideous and cruel in modern times."

In 1987, Hindley admitted that the plea for parole she had submitted to the Home Secretary eight years earlier was "on the whole ... a pack of lies", and to some reporters her co-operation in the searches on Saddleworth Moor "appeared a cynical gesture aimed at ingratiating herself to the parole authorities". Then-Home Secretary David Waddington imposed a whole life tariff on Hindley in July 1990, after she confessed to having been more involved in the murders than she had admitted. Hindley was not informed of the decision until 1994, when a Law Lords ruling obliged the Prison Service to inform all life sentence prisoners of the minimum period they must serve in prison before being considered for parole. In 1996, the Parole Board recommended that Hindley be moved to an open prison. She rejected the idea and in early 1998 was moved to the medium-security HM Prison Highpoint; the House of Lords ruling left open the possibility of later freedom. Between December 1997 and March 2000, Hindley made three separate appeals against her life tariff, claiming she was a reformed woman and no longer a danger to society, but each was rejected by the courts.

When in 2002 another life sentence prisoner challenged the Home Secretary's power to set minimum terms, Hindley and hundreds of others, whose tariffs had been increased by politicians, looked likely to be released. Hindley's release seemed imminent and plans were made by supporters for her to be given a new identity. Home Secretary David Blunkett ordered the GMP to find new charges against Hindley to prevent her release from prison. The investigation was headed by Superintendent Tony Brett, and initially looked at charging Hindley with the murders of Reade and Bennett, but the advice given by government lawyers was that because of the DPP's decision taken fifteen years earlier, a new trial would probably be considered an abuse of process.

On 25 November 2002, the Law Lords agreed that judges, not politicians, should decide how long a criminal spends behind bars, and stripped the Home Secretary of the power to set minimum sentences. Just prior to this, on 15November 2002, Hindley, aged 60 and a chain smoker, died from bronchial pneumonia at West Suffolk Hospital. She had been diagnosed with angina in 1999 and hospitalised after suffering a brain aneurysm. Camera crews "stood rank and file behind steel barriers" outside, but none of Hindley's relatives were among the small congregation of eight to ten people who attended a short service at Cambridge crematorium. Such was the strength of feeling more than thirty-five years after the murders that a reported twenty local undertakers refused to handle her cremation. The Manchester Evening News reported on possible fears that this would result in visitors choosing to avoid or vandalise the park.

Aftermath
David Smith became "reviled by the people of Manchester" for financially profiting from the murders. During the trial, Maureen—eight months pregnant—was attacked in the lift of the building in which she and Smith lived. Their home was vandalised, they regularly received hate mail, and Maureen wrote that she could not let her children out of her sight when they were small. After declining to prosecute the News of the World, Attorney General Sir Elwyn Jones came under political pressure to impose new regulations on the press, but was reluctant to legislate on "chequebook journalism". Instead, he accepted the offer of the Press Council to produce a "declaration of principle" which was published in November 1966 and included rules forbidding criminal witnesses being paid or interviewed—but the News of the World promptly rejected the declaration and the Council had no power to enforce its provisions.

After stabbing another man during a fight, in an attack he claimed was triggered by the abuse he had suffered since the trial, Smith was sentenced to three years in prison in 1969. That same year his children were taken into the care of the local authority. Maureen moved from Underwood Court to a single-bedroom property, and found work in a department store. Subjected to whispering campaigns and petitions to remove her from the estate where she lived, Maureen received no support from her family—her mother had supported Myra during the trial. On his release from prison, Smith moved in with a 15-year-old girl who became his second wife and won custody of his three sons. Maureen managed to repair the relationship with her mother, and moved into a council property in Gorton. She divorced Smith in 1973, and married a lorry driver, Bill Scott, with whom she had a daughter.

Maureen and her immediate family made regular visits to see Hindley, who reportedly adored her niece. In 1980, Maureen suffered a brain haemorrhage; Hindley was allowed to visit her in hospital, but arrived an hour after her death. Sheila and Patrick Kilbride, who were by then divorced, attended Maureen's funeral thinking that Hindley might be there; Patrick mistook Bill Scott's daughter from a previous relationship for Hindley and tried to attack her. Shortly before her death at the age of 70, Sheila said: "If she [Hindley] ever comes out of jail I'll kill her". It was a threat repeated by her son Danny.

In 1972, Smith was acquitted of the murder of his father, who had been suffering from terminal cancer. He pleaded guilty to manslaughter and was sentenced to two days' detention. He remarried and moved to Lincolnshire with his three sons, and was exonerated of any participation in the Moors murders by Hindley's confession in 1987. In 2011, he co-authored the book Witness with biographer Carol Ann Lee. Smith died from cancer in Ireland in 2012.

Reade's mother was admitted to Springfield Mental Hospital in Manchester. She was present, under heavy sedation, at the funeral of her daughter on 7 August 1987. Five years after their son was murdered, Sheila and Patrick Kilbride divorced. Downey's mother died in 1999 from cancer of the liver. Since her daughter's death, she had campaigned to ensure that Hindley remained in prison, and doctors said that the stress had contributed to the severity of her illness. Bennett's mother continued to visit Saddleworth Moor, where it is believed that Bennett is buried. She died in August 2012.

Manchester City Council decided in 1987 to demolish the house in which Brady and Hindley had lived on Wardle Brook Avenue, and where Downey and Evans were murdered, citing "excessive media interest [in the property] creating unpleasantness for residents".

In November 2017 it was revealed that, without the knowledge of her family, some of the remains of Pauline Reade, including her jaw bone, had been kept at the University of Leeds by Greater Manchester Police. GMP apologised to the Reade family. In October 2018 her remains were re-buried at her grave in Gorton Cemetery, Manchester.

Lasting notoriety 
The photographs and tape recording of the torture of Downey exhibited in court, and the nonchalant responses of Brady and Hindley, helped to ensure their lasting notoriety. Brady, who said that he did not want to be released, was rarely mentioned in the news, but Hindley's insistent desire to be released made her a figure of public hate—especially as she failed to confess to involvement in the Reade and Bennett murders for twenty years. Hindley's role in the crimes also violated gender norms: her betrayal of the maternal role fed public perceptions of her "inherent evil", and made her a "poster girl" for moral panics about serial murder and paedophilia in subsequent decades. Her often reprinted photograph, taken shortly after she was arrested, is described by some commentators as similar to the mythical Medusa and, according to author Helen Birch, has become "synonymous with the idea of feminine evil". At the 1997 Sensation art exhibition, a reproduction composed of children's handprints caused controversy. Given Hindley's status as co-defendant in the first serial murder trial held since the abolition of the death penalty, retribution was a common theme among those who sought to keep her locked away. Even Hindley's mother insisted that she should die in prison, partly for fear for Hindley's safety. Some commentators expressed the view that of the two, Hindley was the "more evil".

Lord Longford, a Catholic convert, campaigned to secure the release of "celebrated" criminals, and Hindley in particular, which earned him constant derision from the public and the press. He described Hindley as a "delightful" person and said "you could loathe what people did but should not loathe what they were because human personality was sacred even though human behaviour was very often appalling". Tabloid newspapers branded him a "loony" and a "do-gooder" for supporting Hindley, whom they described as evil. She became a long-running source of material for the press, which printed embellished tales of her "cushy" life at the "5-star" Cookham Wood Prison and her liaisons with prison staff and other inmates.

The book The Loathsome Couple by Edward Gorey (Mead, 1977) was inspired by the Moors murders. Manchester band The Smiths' song "Suffer Little Children", from their 1984 self-titled debut album, was also inspired by the case. The case featured in two television dramas in 2006, See No Evil: The Moors Murders and Longford.

According to the 2020 television documentary Rose West & Myra Hindley: Their Untold Story with Trevor McDonald, Hindley and another British serial murderer, Rosemary West, "grew close in jail, bonding over their similar crimes, then had an affair, which cooled as they became rivals to be 'prison royalty.'"

See also

 List of solved missing person cases
 Thrill killing
 List of serial killers in the United Kingdom

References

Notes

Citations

Bibliography

Further reading

External links
The official Keith Bennett website (archived version)

1963 in England
1964 in England
1965 in England
1966 in England
1963 murders in the United Kingdom
1964 murders in the United Kingdom
1965 murders in the United Kingdom
1966 murders in the United Kingdom
Child sexual abuse in England
Incidents of violence against girls
Incidents of violence against boys
History of Greater Manchester
Murder in Greater Manchester
Murder in Yorkshire
Murdered English children
Rape in England
Serial murders in the United Kingdom
Torture in England
Violence against children in England